The Arunachal Pradesh Public Service Commission (APPSC) is the state agency authorized by the Government of Arunachal Pradesh  to conduct the Civil Services Examination for entry-level appointments to the various  departments and Services under Government of Arunachal Pradesh and to advise the government on civil service matters.

Controversy
The commission over the course of its existence has displayed utter incompetence leading to dozens of litigation, Protest and strikes including the infamous relay fast that led to the resignation of the Chairman of the Commission. In 2017 the paper set by the commission for preliminary exam turned out to be copy-pasted from various websites which led to the scrapping of the exam conducted that drew huge public flak on the competence and integrity of the current members. In 2018 the exam was conducted again. But was Challenged by some candidates citing inconsistency in commerce optional paper which again led to a huge outcry and legal challenge in 21 more subjects. The case is still ongoing in the Supreme Court.

See also

 List of Public service commissions in India

References 

1. https://arunachaltimes.in/index.php/2018/11/16/grieving-appscce-candidates-begin-hunger-strike/
2. 

State public service commissions of India
Government agencies established in 1988
State agencies of Arunachal Pradesh
1988 establishments in Arunachal Pradesh